In German heroic legend, Alberich is a dwarf. He features most prominently in the poems Nibelungenlied and Ortnit. He also features in the Old Norse collection of German legends called the Thidreksaga under the name Alfrikr. His name means "ruler of supernatural beings (elves)", and is equivalent to Old French Auberon (English Oberon).

The name was later used for a character in Richard Wagner's opera cycle Der Ring des Nibelungen.

Mythology
Alberich plays a prominent role in the Nibelungenlied, where he is the guardian of the Nibelung's treasure and has the strength of twelve men. Siegfried overpowers him using his cloak of invisibility (Tarnkappe), after which the dwarf serves the hero. Siegfried later pulls his beard in mock combat when he arrives unannounced to claim the treasure.
Siegfried seeks to woo the daughter of the heathen king Machorel, Alberich reveals his paternity to Ortnit and aids him in his quest, playing tricks on the heathen king and even impersonating Mohammed. When Ortnit sets out on his final fatal adventure against a plague of dragons, Alberich takes back the magic ring and warns Ortnit not to go on his quest.

In the Thidrekssaga, Alfrikr makes the swords Eckisax and Nagelringr, giving this last sword to Thidrek.

References to Alberich outside of heroic poetry are rare.

Wagner
In Wagner's opera cycle Der Ring des Nibelungen, Alberich is the chief of the Nibelungen race of dwarves and the main antagonist driving events. In Das Rheingold, the first opera in the cycle, he gains the power to forge the ring after renouncing love and stealing the gold of the river Rhein, of which the ring is made. His brother, the smith Mime, creates the Tarnhelm for Alberich. News of the gold robbery and ring of power incites gods and giants alike to action.  The giants Fafner and Fasolt demand the ring in payment for building Valhalla, and carry off Freia as a hostage.  In Götterdämmerung (the fourth opera in Wagner's cycle), Hagen, the murderer of the hero Siegfried, is the half-human half-dwarf son of Alberich by Grimhilde, a human woman. This detail of Hagen's origin is Wagner's invention, not taken from the myth or epic poems, in which Hagen is an ordinary human being with human parents.

Wagner's Alberich is a composite character, mostly based on Alberich from the Nibelungenlied, but also on Andvari from Norse mythology. He has been widely described, most notably by Theodor Adorno, as a negative Jewish stereotype, with his race expressed through "distorted" music and "muttering" speech; other critics, however, disagree with this assessment.

Alberich shows up in Rheingold, not in Walküre, then again in Siegfried, and finally in Götterdämmerung (while Hagen is sleeping, commanding Hagen to regain the Ring).  At the end of the opera, Alberich along with the three Rhine maidens are the only key characters in Der Ring des Nibelungen that remain alive.  Wotan seems to die at the end of Götterdämmerung when Valhalla goes up in flames, Fasfolt from Rheingold dies in Rheingold, Siegelinde and Sigmund from Walküre die in Walküre (Siegelinde is at least dead by the time Siegfried begins, some 15–20 years later), Mime (from Rheingold and Siegfried) dies in Siegfried, Gunther and Hagen from Götterdämmerung both die at the end of it, and Siegfried (from Siegfried and Götterdämmerung) and Brunhilde (from Walküre, Siegfried, and Götterdämmerung) both die in Götterdämmerung.

Legacy 
In World War I, the German retreat to fortified positions in the Hindenburg Line, which was officially named after Siegfried despite its common name, was named Operation Alberich.

During WWII, Germany developed anechoic tiles, which were nicknamed Alberich.

See also
 Oberon (the French translation of Alberich used for the name of the "King of Fairies" in French and English texts)
 Elegast/Elbegast/Alegast— elf guest, elf spirit (Dutch, German, and Scandinavian texts, respectively)

Notes

References
 Bulfinch, Thomas. 1834. Bulfinch's Mythology. Reprinted by New York: Harper & Row, 1970, p. 354–356, 903. .

 Guerber, Helene A. 1895. Myths of Northern Lands - Index. p. 218, p. 295 index. File retrieved 7/15/2007.

Norse dwarves
Elves
German heroic legends
Germanic mythology
Nibelung tradition